Marion County is a county of the U.S. state of Alabama. As of the 2020 census the population was 29,341. The county seat is Hamilton. The county was created by an act of the Alabama Territorial General Assembly on February 13, 1818. The county seat was originally established in Pikeville in 1820, and moved to Hamilton in 1881. The county was named by planter and US Indian agent John Dabney Terrell, Sr., in recognition of General Francis Marion of South Carolina.

Marion County is located in the northwestern part of the state, bounded on the west by the state of Mississippi. It encompasses . The county is a prohibition or dry county, however, the sale of alcohol is permitted within the cities of Guin, Hamilton, and Winfield.

History
The county was created by the Alabama Territorial General Assembly on February 13, 1818, preceding Alabama's statehood by almost two years. It was created from land acquired from the Chickasaw Indians by the Treaty of 1816. Marion County included all of its current territory and parts of what are now Winston, Walker, Fayette, and Lamar counties in Alabama as well as portions of present-day Lowndes, Monroe, and Itawamba counties in Mississippi. The county was named in honor of General Francis Marion (1732–1795), an American Revolutionary War hero from South Carolina who was known as "The Swamp Fox." Many early settlers of Marion County came from Kentucky and Tennessee after General Andrew Jackson established the Military Road. The first towns in the area were Pikeville, Hamilton (formerly named Toll Gate), Winfield, and Guin.

The county's first seat was settled in 1818 at Cotton Gin Port, near present-day Amory, Mississippi. It was moved in 1819 to the home of Henry Greer along the Buttahatchee River, in 1820, the first permanent county seat was established at Pikeville, now a ghost town, located between present day Hamilton and Guin, along U.S. Highway 43. Pikeville served as the county seat of Marion County until 1882. Although the town is now abandoned, the home of Judge John Dabney Terrell Sr., which served as the third county courthouse, still stands. In 1882, Hamilton became the county seat. The first courthouse in Hamilton was destroyed by fire on March 30, 1887, and the second courthouse, constructed in the same place, also burned. A new courthouse, constructed of local sandstone opened in 1901. In 1959, the building was significantly remodeled to give the structure its current 1950's "international style" design theme.

Geography

Adjacent counties
Franklin County (north)
Winston County (east)
Walker County (southeast)
Fayette County (south)
Lamar County (southwest)
Monroe County, Mississippi (southwest)
Itawamba County, Mississippi (west)

Demographics

2000 census
At the 2000 census there were 31,214 people, 12,697 households, and 9,040 families living in the county.  The population density was 42 people per square mile (16/km2).  There were 14,416 housing units at an average density of 19 per square mile (8/km2).  The racial makeup of the county was 94.76% White, 3.3% Black or African American, 0.29% Native American, 0.20% Asian, 0.03% Pacific Islander, 0.39% from other races, and 0.70% from two or more races.  1.15% of the population were Hispanic or Latino of any race.
Of the 12,697 households 30.40% had children under the age of 18 living with them, 58.40% were married couples living together, 9.50% had a female householder with no husband present, and 28.80% were non-families. 26.50% of households were one person and 12.70% were one person aged 65 or older.  The average household size was 2.39 and the average family size was 2.87.

The age distribution was 22.50% under the age of 18, 8.20% from 18 to 24, 28.20% from 25 to 44, 25.20% from 45 to 64, and 15.80% 65 or older.  The median age was 39 years. For every 100 females there were 98.00 males.  For every 100 females age 18 and over, there were 95.20 males.

The median household income was $27,475 and the median family income was $34,359. Males had a median income of $26,913 versus $19,022 for females. The per capita income for the county was $15,321.  About 12.00% of families and 15.60% of the population were below the poverty line, including 18.80% of those under age 18 and 20.00% of those age 65 or over.

2010 census
At the 2010 census there were 30,776 people, 12,651 households, and 8,676 families living in the county. The population density was 41 people per square mile (16/km2). There were 14,737 housing units at an average density of 19 per square mile (8/km2). The racial makeup of the county was 93.6% White, 3.8% Black or African American, 0.3% Native American, 0.2% Asian, 0.0% Pacific Islander, 0.9% from other races, and 1.1% from two or more races. 2.1% of the population were Hispanic or Latino of any race.
Of the 12,651 households 26.3% had children under the age of 18 living with them, 51.9% were married couples living together, 12.1% had a female householder with no husband present, and 31.4% were non-families. 28.4% of households were one person and 13.1% were one person aged 65 or older.  The average household size was 2.36 and the average family size was 2.87.

The age distribution was 21.7% under the age of 18, 7.7% from 18 to 24, 24.0% from 25 to 44, 28.4% from 45 to 64, and 18.3% 65 or older. The median age was 42.8 years. For every 100 females there were 98.8 males. For every 100 females age 18 and over, there were 101.5 males.

The median household income was $32,769 and the median family income was $44,223. Males had a median income of $34,089 versus $24,481 for females. The per capita income for the county was $19,030. About 13.3% of families and 17.8% of the population were below the poverty line, including 28.3% of those under age 18 and 12.7% of those age 65 or over.

2020 census

As of the 2020 United States census, there were 29,341 people, 11,997 households, and 8,030 families residing in the county.

Education
Two public school systems, Marion County Schools and Winfield City Schools, operate in the county. Hamilton is home to a campus of Bevill State Community College.
Marion County School System
Philips Elementary and High School (Bear Creek)
Brilliant Elementary School
Brilliant High School
Guin Elementary School
Marion County High School (Guin)
Hackleburg Elementary and High School
Hamilton Elementary School
Hamilton Middle School
Hamilton High School,

Winfield City School System
Winfield Elementary School
Winfield Middle School
Winfield High School

Events
Jerry Brown Arts Festival - Hamilton (March)
Neighbor Day - Hackleburg (Last Saturday in April)
MayFest - Guin (Second Saturday in May)
CoalFest - Brilliant (Memorial Day)
Mule Day - Winfield (September)
Buttahatchee River Fall Fest - Hamilton (October)

Media

Newspapers
The Court House at Hamilton burned in March 1887.  All newspapers before that date were lost in the flames as the Court House was the repository for them.  The newspapers that we have record of after the fire are:
The Marion County Herald - (1885–1890) The first newspaper available for The Marion Herald is April 5, 1887 due to the Court House Fire.  The original date of beginning and editors have been lost with the Court House fire, but seems to have been started around April 1885. The Lamar News states that A. A. Wall had been with the Marion Herald before he started The Vernon Courier which was in 1886. No earlier publishers of the paper have been found.  The newspaper passed through several hands before closing its doors.  Some of the notable editors include W. F. Green, James S. Clements, W. T. Gast, L. J. Clark, and others. The first editors were listed under the name The Herald Publishing Company.
The Guin Dispatch (1888–1889) The Guin Dispatch was started around November 1888 by James S. Clements. It did not last long - only 13 issues.  It closed its doors with the last issue of Feb 23, 1889.
The Hamilton Times (1890–1893)
The Hamilton Free Press (1893–1894)
The Hamilton News Press (1895)
The Hamilton Appeal (1896)
The Guin Gazette (1897)
The Gazette Appeal (1897)
The Winfield Enterprise (1899–1900)
The Marion County Democrat (1900–1904)
The Marion County Republican (1908–1909)
The Marion County News (1894, 1896 - 1959?)
New Hope Record (1920)
The Winfield Journal (1930–1959)
The Hackleburg Sentinel (1937–1955)
The Marion County Journal (1975)
The Guin Gazette (1987)
The Gazette Appeal (1987)
The Journal Record (1976–present)

Transportation

Major highways

 Interstate 22
 U.S. Highway 43
 U.S. Highway 78
 U.S. Highway 278
 State Route 13
 State Route 17
 State Route 19
 State Route 44
 State Route 74
 State Route 129

Rail
BNSF Railway
Norfolk Southern Railway

Air
Marion County-Rankin Fite Airport

Government

Communities

Cities
Guin
Haleyville (partly in Winston County)
Hamilton (county seat)
Winfield (partly in Fayette County)

Towns
Bear Creek
Brilliant
Glen Allen (partly in Fayette County)
Gu-Win (partly in Fayette County)
Hackleburg
Twin

Unincorporated communities
Barnesville
Bexar
Byrd
Pigeye
Pull Tight
Shottsville
South Haleyville
Texas

Ghost town
Pikeville

See also
National Register of Historic Places listings in Marion County, Alabama
Properties on the Alabama Register of Landmarks and Heritage in Marion County, Alabama

References

External links

Marion County site
Marion County Historical Society
USGenWeb Marion County
Digital Alabama Guide to Marion County

 
1818 establishments in Alabama Territory
Populated places established in 1818
Counties of Appalachia